Sheykh Mohammad or Shaikh Muhammad may refer to:
 Sheykh Mohammad, Ardabil
 Sheykh Mohammad, Fars
 Sheykh Mohammad, Khuzestan
 Sheykh Mohammad, Ahvaz, Khuzestan Province